The Championnat de France de Futsal "Division 1" or "D1" is the premier futsal league in France, organized by Fédération Française de Football. There are 12 teams in the first level, the team ranked first wins the title of national Champion and qualifies for the UEFA Futsal Cup. The teams ranked 11th and 12th are relegated to Division 2. 

"D2" is the second level, and has two groups with 10 teams each. The teams ranked first in each group are promoted to Division 1. The teams ranked 8th to 10th in each group are relegated. Below is the regional level.

Champions
Challenge National

Championnat de France

External links
futsalplanet.com 
FFF.fr 

Futsal competitions in France
France
futsal
2009 establishments in France
Sports leagues established in 2009
Professional sports leagues in France